The 1994 FIFA World Cup was the 15th FIFA World Cup, the world championship for men's national soccer teams. It was hosted by the United States and took place from June 17 to July 17, 1994, at nine venues across the country. The United States was chosen as the host by FIFA on July 4, 1988. Despite soccer's relative lack of popularity in the host nation, the tournament was the most financially successful in World Cup history. It broke tournament records with overall attendance of 3,587,538 and an average of 68,991 per game, marks that stood unsurpassed as of 2022 despite the expansion of the competition from 24 to 32 teams starting with the 1998 World Cup.

Brazil was crowned the winner after defeating Italy 3–2 in a penalty shoot-out at the Rose Bowl in Pasadena, California near Los Angeles, after the game had ended 0–0 after extra time. It was the first World Cup final to be decided on penalties. The victory made Brazil the first nation to win four World Cup titles. There were three new entrants in the tournament: Greece, Nigeria and Saudi Arabia; Russia also appeared as a separate nation for the first time, following the breakup of the Soviet Union, and for the first time since 1938, a unified Germany took part in the tournament. They were also defending champions, but were eliminated in quarter-finals by Bulgaria. It was the first World Cup where three points were awarded for a victory instead of two and also the first with the back-pass rule. This was done to encourage a more attacking style of soccer as a response to the criticism of the defensive tactics and low-scoring matches of the 1990 World Cup. This resulted in an average of 2.71 goals per match.

Background and preparations

Bidding process
Three nations bid for host duties: United States, Brazil, and Morocco. The vote was held in Zurich on July 4, 1988 (Independence Day in the United States), and only took one round with the United States bid receiving a little over half of the votes by the FIFA Executive Committee members. FIFA hoped that by staging the world's most prestigious tournament there, it would lead to a growth of interest in the sport.

An inspection committee also found that the proposed Brazilian stadiums were deficient, while the Moroccan bid relied on the construction of nine new stadiums. Conversely, all the proposed stadiums in the United States were already built and fully functioning; US Soccer spent $500 million preparing and organizing the tournament, far less than the billions other countries previously had spent and subsequently would spend on preparing for this tournament. The U.S. bid was seen as the favorite and was prepared in response to losing the right to be the replacement host for the 1986 tournament following Colombia's withdrawal.

One condition FIFA imposed was the creation of a professional soccer league – Major League Soccer was founded in 1993 and began operating in 1996. There was some initial controversy about awarding the World Cup to a country where soccer was not a nationally popular sport, and at the time, in 1988, the U.S. no longer had a professional league; the North American Soccer League, established in 1967, had folded in 1984 after attendance faded. The success of the 1984 Summer Olympics in Los Angeles, particularly the soccer tournament that drew 1.4 million spectators throughout the event, also contributed to FIFA's decision.

The United States had previously bid to host the 1986 FIFA World Cup, after Colombia withdrew as the host nation in November 1982 because of economic concerns. Despite a presentation led by former North American Soccer League players Pelé and Franz Beckenbauer, as well as former United States Secretary of State Henry Kissinger, the executive committee selected Mexico. There were proposals by FIFA to introduce larger goals and breaks after every quarter instead of just at half-time in order to appease US television advertisers. These proposals were met with resistance, and ultimately rejected.

Venues

The games were played in nine cities across the contiguous United States. All stadiums had a capacity of at least 53,000, and their usual tenants were professional or college American football teams. Other considered venues in other major cities across the United States such as Atlanta, Denver, Kansas City, Las Vegas, Miami, Minneapolis, New Orleans, Philadelphia, Seattle and Tampa were not used, as well as venues in smaller towns such as Annapolis, Maryland; Columbus, Ohio; Corvallis, Oregon; and New Haven, Connecticut. The venue used most was the Rose Bowl in Pasadena, with eight games, among them one round of 16 game, a semi-final, the third-place game, and the final. Giants Stadium near New York hosted seven games including a semi-final; Boston (Foxborough), San Francisco (Stanford), and Dallas hosted six games each and Chicago, Washington, and Orlando each hosted five games. The least used was the Pontiac Silverdome near Detroit, the first indoor stadium used in a World Cup, with four group stage games. The Pontiac Silverdome was also the only venue of the nine used that did not host any knockout round games.

Because of the large area of the continental United States, the game locations were often far apart. Some teams in Groups A and B had to travel from Los Angeles or San Francisco all the way to Detroit and back again, covering  and four time zones. The teams in Groups E and F had it a bit easier—they played exclusively in New York (East Rutherford), Washington, and Orlando, which, while far apart, were at least all in the same time zone. A few teams, such as Cameroon and Colombia, did not have to travel to cities across the country to play games.

The variety of climate in different cities all over the United States also sometimes made playing conditions challenging. Aside from the oceanic coolness of Boston (Foxborough), the Mediterranean climate of San Francisco (Stanford), and occasionally the coolness of Chicago, as they had been in Mexico in 1970 and 1986 most matches were played in hot and/or humid conditions, thanks to nearly all of the games being scheduled to be played during the day instead of at night in order to suit a time difference compromise for television in Europe, Africa, and the Middle East; this had always been done every time a World Cup was held in the Americas. Although playing in the mostly dry heat and smoggy conditions of Los Angeles (Pasadena) and the mixture of heat and humidity of Washington and New York sometimes proved to be difficult, the cities with the most consistently oppressive conditions were Orlando and Dallas in the South, because of the combination of heat and extreme humidity. Dallas was not much different: in the humid heat of a Texas summer, temperatures exceeded  during mid-day, when games there were staged in the open-type Cotton Bowl meant that conditions were just as oppressive there as they were in Orlando. Detroit also proved to be difficult: the Pontiac Silverdome did not have a working cooling system and because it was an air-supported stadium, the air could not escape through circulation, so temperatures inside the stadium would climb past  with 40% humidity. United States midfielder Thomas Dooley described the Silverdome as "the worst place I have ever played at".

Of these nine stadiums, all but one have since been either demolished and replaced by other stadia, or have been moderately or heavily modified. The Pontiac Silverdome, Giants Stadium, and Foxboro Stadium have been demolished, and RFK Stadium is no longer in use and is slated for demolition by 2023. Stanford Stadium, the Cotton Bowl, the Citrus Bowl (Camping World Stadium), and Soldier Field have all been moderately or heavily modified. The Rose Bowl is the only largely unmodified stadium that was used for this tournament.

Participating teams and officials

Qualification

Three teams: one African, one Asian, and one European, made their debuts at the 1994 tournament. Nigeria qualified from the African zone alongside Cameroon and Morocco as CAF was granted three spots as a result of the strong performances by African teams in 1986 and 1990. In the Asian zone, Saudi Arabia qualified for the first time by topping the final round group ahead of South Korea as both edged out Japan, who was close to making its own World Cup debut, but was denied by Iraq in what became known as the "Agony of Doha". In the European zone, Greece made their first World Cup appearance after topping a group from which Russia also qualified, competing independently for the first time after the dissolution of the Soviet Union.

The defending champions West Germany were united with their East German counterparts, representing the unified Germany for the first time since the 1938 World Cup. Norway qualified for the first time since 1938, Bolivia for the first time since 1950 (and the last time as of 2022), and Switzerland for the first time since 1966. Norway's 56-year gap between appearances in the final tournament equaled Egypt's record in the previous tournament as the longest. This record was later broken by Wales when they qualified for the 2022 tournament, after a 64-year absence. Mexico had its first successful qualification campaign since 1978, failing to qualify in 1982, qualifying as hosts in 1986 and being banned for the Cachirules scandal in 1990.

The qualification campaigns of both Czechoslovakia and Yugoslavia were affected by political events. The nation of Czechoslovakia dissolved in 1993, completing its qualifying group under the name "Representation of Czechs and Slovaks" (RCS), but failed to qualify for the finals, having been edged out by Romania and Belgium in Group 4. Yugoslavia (which was supposed to play in Group 5) was suspended from international competition in 1992 as part of United Nations sanctions against the country as a result of the Yugoslav Wars. The sanctions were not lifted until 1994, by which time it was no longer possible for the team to qualify. Chile's suspension from the 1990 FIFA World Cup, following the forced interruption of their qualification game against Brazil, extended to the 1994 qualifiers as well.

This was the first World Cup since World War II in which none of the UK Home Nations of England, Scotland, Northern Ireland and Wales qualified (they withdrew their FIFA memberships between 1928 and 1946, during the first three tournaments), with England (finishing third behind Norway and Netherlands in Group 2) missing out after having finished fourth in the 1990 tournament, and Scotland (who finished fourth in Group 1) failing to qualify for the first time since 1970. France, who had been already designated as hosts of the 1998 tournament, also missed out following surprise home losses to Israel and Bulgaria. This was the second World Cup in a row for which France had failed to qualify, and the last one to date not to feature England, France, and Japan. Other notable absentees were 1986 and 1990 Round of 16 participants Uruguay, UEFA Euro 1992 champions Denmark, Paraguay, Poland, Portugal and Hungary.

List of qualified teams
The following 24 teams, shown with their pre-tournament FIFA World Ranking from June 1994, qualified for the final tournamentː

AFC (2)
  (34)
  (37)
CAF (3)
  (24)
  (28)
  (11)
OFC (0)
 None qualified

CONCACAF (2)
  (16)
  (23) (hosts)
CONMEBOL (4)
  (8)
  (3)
  (43)
  (17)

UEFA (13)
  (27)
  (29)
  (1)
  (31)
  (4)
  (2)
  (6)
  (14)
  (7)
  (19)
  (5)
  (10)
  (12)

Squads

Teams were selected following usual FIFA rules with 22 players. Greece, Italy, Saudi Arabia, and Spain were the only countries that had all their players coming from domestic teams, while the Republic of Ireland and Nigeria had no players from domestic teams. Saudi Arabia was the only team with no players from European teams.

Referees

CAF
  Lim Kee Chong
  Neji Jouini

AFC
  Jamal Al Sharif
  Ali Bujsaim

UEFA
  Fabio Baldas
  Manuel Díaz Vega
  Philip Don
  Bo Karlsson
  Hellmut Krug
  Peter Mikkelsen
  Leslie Mottram
  Pierluigi Pairetto
  Sándor Puhl
  Joël Quiniou
  Kurt Röthlisberger
  Mario van der Ende

CONCACAF
  Arturo Angeles
  Rodrigo Badilla
  Arturo Brizio Carter

CONMEBOL
  José Torres Cadena
  Ernesto Filippi
  Francisco Oscar Lamolina
  Renato Marsiglia
  Alberto Tejada

Draw

Seeding and drawing
The FIFA Organizing Committee upheld the tradition to seed the hosts (United States) and holders (Germany), along with the other four teams ranked in the top five based on their results obtained in the last three FIFA World Cups. The newly introduced FIFA World Ranking was not used as part of the calculated ranking for the seeding in this World Cup, as FIFA considered it to be too new. Despite that it was not used in any way, for comparison purposes the teams' pre-tournament FIFA World ranking position from June 1994 are shown in parenthesis, followed by the official and used ranking (OR) position determined by the results obtained in the last three world cups.

The six top-seeded teams, were allocated in pot 1 and would be drawn into the first position of the six groups playing in the group stage. The remaining 18 teams were allocated into three pots based on geographical sections, with the: six qualified teams from Africa and Americas in pot 2, the top-6 ranked European teams in pot 3, while pot 4 comprised the 7th-10th best qualified European teams along with the two qualified Asian teams.

The principle of the draw was that each of the six drawn groups would have one team drawn respectively from pot 1, 2, 3 and 4; while respecting the following geographical limitations:
 At least two European teams from UEFA in all groups, with one group having three European teams.
 United States and Mexico can not be drawn in the same group, due to the rule of only accepting maximum one CONCACAF team per group.
 Brazil and Argentina can not be drawn with another South American team, due to the rule of only accepting maximum one CONMEBOL team per group.
 As all qualified Asian teams from AFC were in the same pot 4, and all qualified African teams from CAF in the same pot 2, this automatically respected the rule of only allowing maximum one Asian team and maximum one African team per group, as part of the normal draw procedure - without needing to observe special restricting sub-rules for them.

 The draw took place at the Las Vegas Convention Center and was televised live on 19 December 1993 on ESPN in the United States & Eurosport in all Europe.

Ahead of the draw, the FIFA Organizing Committee had decided to allocate the top-seeded first group position A1 for the United States as the hosts, C1 for defending champions Germany, and E1 for the Italian team who had requested to play most of their group matches at the Giants Stadium in New York. The three other top seeded teams would be located at the first position of either group B/D/F, with the decision largely depending on the identity of the other drawn group members for the seeded teams. Therefore, this last decision would only be made by a secret vote made by the FIFA Organizing Committee a few minutes after all teams had been drawn for all groups, and the decision would only be announced as the last step of the televised draw event. To make this procedure possible, the six drawn groups would during the draw be given the colors green, orange, white, black, pink and blue; and the closing remarks at the event would then reveal the group letters represented by the colors. The six groups from A to F would play their group matches in the following nine cities:
 Group A and B are playing in Detroit, San Francisco and Los Angeles.
 Group C and D are playing in Chicago, Dallas and Boston.
 Group E and F are playing in New York, Washington DC, and Orlando.

Procedure for the draw:
 Pot 1 was used to draw the six top-seeded teams into the first position of the six groups designated by the colors green, orange, white, black, pink and blue. Group letters behind each color would only be decided by a following secret FIFA Organizing Committee vote, and only be revealed after the draw had been completed. Although the committee had already predetermined ahead of the draw that: the United States should play in group A, Germany should play in group C, and Italy should play in group E.
 Pot 2 was used to draw one team to each of the six colored groups, with the draw conducted in the color order from left to right (green, orange, white, black, pink, blue); while this order however at the same time had to respect the following restricted geographical rules:
 Rule 1: First two drawn non South American teams shall irrespectively of the color order, first be drawn into the two groups led by a South American team, in order to avoid the possibility for these groups later to be drawn by a second South American team.
 Rule 2: First drawn South American team or one of the last two African teams shall irrespectively of the color order, first be drawn into the group led by the CONCACAF team, the United States, in order to avoid the possibility for this group later to be drawn by the second CONCACAF team Mexico.
 Rule 3: One of the two South American teams or one of the last two African teams shall irrespectively of the color order, first be drawn into the first available open group being led by a European team, in order to avoid the meeting of two South American teams in the same group.
 Rule 4: Mexico can not be drawn together with the United States as they are both CONCACAF teams, so Mexico will be grouped with the first still open available group being led by a European or South American team, as per the color order.
 Pot 3 was used to draw one European team to each of the six colored groups, with the draw conducted in the color order from left to right (green, orange, white, black, pink, blue).
 Pot 4 was used to draw one European/Asian team to each of six colored groups, with the draw conducted in the color order from left to right (green, orange, white, black, pink, blue). However, in order to respect the geographical rule that five of the groups shall have two European teams - and the rule that three European teams is only allowed in one group, the color order will be skipped subject to these allocation rules:
 Rule 1: All drawn Asian (AFC) teams would not be drawn into any of the three groups led by a top-seeded CONCACAF/CONMEBOL team (United States/Brazil/Argentina), but would instead only be allowed to join a group being led by a top-seeded European team.
 Rule 2: All drawn European (UEFA) teams, shall first be drawn into the three groups led by a top-seeded CONCACAF/CONMEBOL team (United States/Brazil/Argentina), until the point of time when only European team(s) remain to be drawn from the last pot 4.
 The exact group position number for the teams (2, 3 or 4) in each colored group, were also drawn immediately from six special group bowls, after each respective team had been drawn from pot 2, 3 and 4.
 Group letters behind each color (green, orange, white, black, pink and blue) would finally be decided by a final secret FIFA Organizing Committee vote, being announced as the last part of the televised event.

The draw was officiated by FIFA general-secretary Sepp Blatter. Teams were drawn by German legend Franz Beckenbauer, heavyweight boxing champion Evander Holyfield and comedian and actor Robin Williams. Numbers for placement in the group were drawn by actor Beau Bridges, Women's World Cup champion Michelle Akers, model Carol Alt, artist Peter Max, racecar driver Mario Andretti and Olympic gold medalist in gymnastics Mary Lou Retton.

Results of the draw

In each group, the teams will play three matches, one against each of the other teams. After completion of the group stage, the best two teams of each group as well as the four best ranked third places, will advance to round 16 in the knockout stage. This format was identical with the tournament structure being used in 1986 and 1990. Compared to all previous editions of the World Cup, a victory in the group stage will however now be rewarded with 3 points instead of the previously granted 2 points.

Summary

The format of the competition stayed the same as in the 1990 World Cup: 24 teams qualified, divided into six groups of four. Sixteen teams would qualify for the knockout phase: the six group winners, the six group runners-up, and the four third-placed teams with the best records. This was the last time this format was used, due to the expansion of the finals tournament in 1998 to 32 teams. FIFA introduced three rule changes for this tournament to encourage attacking play: three points awarded for a win in a group stage match instead of two, a relaxed offside rule and a ban on picking up back-passes to goalkeepers. The number of goals increased to 2.73 per game from the record-low of 2.21 in 1990.

The tournament saw the end of Diego Maradona's World Cup career, having played in the 1982, 1986, and 1990 World Cups, and leading Argentina to the 1986 World Cup title and the final of the 1990 World Cup. Maradona was expelled from the tournament after he failed a drug test that uncovered ephedrine, a weight-loss drug, in his blood. Colombia, despite high expectations due to their style and impressive qualifying campaign, failed to advance from the round robin. The team was dogged by influence from betting syndicates and drug cartels, with coach Francisco Maturana receiving death threats over squad selection. After scoring an own goal for the United States and effectively eliminating Colombia from the competition, defender Andrés Escobar was shot to death outside a bar in a Medellín suburb 10 days later.

On the field, Bulgaria was one of the biggest surprises of the tournament. The Bulgarians had never won a game in five previous World Cup finals but, led by Hristo Stoichkov who eventually shared the tournament lead in scoring, they made a surprising run; Bulgaria won two of their three group games to qualify for the second round, where they advanced with a 3–1 penalty shoot-out win over Mexico. Bulgaria then faced the reigning world champions, Germany, in the quarter-finals, where goals from Stoichkov and Yordan Letchkov gave them a 2–1 victory. Bulgaria went on to finish in fourth place after losing to Italy and Sweden, in the semi-finals and third-place game, respectively.

The host nation United States, after a 23rd-place finish in the 1990 tournament, advanced to the second round as one of the best third-place teams. They were eliminated in the Round of 16 in a 1–0 defeat to Brazil on Independence Day.

Brazil's win over the hosts helped take them to the final against Italy. Brazil's path was relatively smooth as they never trailed over 270 minutes of the knockout stage, defeating the Netherlands in the quarter-finals and Sweden in the semis after the aforementioned win over the hosts. The Italians meanwhile had made hard work of reaching the final. During the group stage, Italy struggled and narrowly advanced to the next round, despite losing 1–0 to the Republic of Ireland. Italian playmaker Roberto Baggio, who as the reigning FIFA World Player of the Year and Ballon D'Or holder, was expected to be one of the stars of the tournament, had not yet scored a goal. During the Round of 16 games against Nigeria, Italy was trailing 1–0 in the dying minutes when Baggio scored the tying goal, forcing the game into extra time. He scored again with a penalty kick to send Italy through. Baggio carried the Italians from there, scoring the game-winning goal in the quarter-final against Spain, and both goals in Italy's semi-final victory over Bulgaria.

The third-place playoff was set between Bulgaria and Sweden, the team which scored more goals than any other in this World Cup with 15 over seven matches. These teams had also previously met in the qualifying group. Sweden won, 4–0. Swedish forward Tomas Brolin was named to the All-star team.

The final game at the Rose Bowl was tense but devoid of scoring chances. It was the second time in 24 years that the two nations had met in a final. After 120 goalless minutes, the World Cup was decided for the first time by a penalty shoot-out. After four rounds, Brazil led 3–2, and Baggio, playing injured, had to score to keep Italy's hopes alive. He missed by shooting it over the crossbar, and the Brazilians were crowned champions for the fourth time. After the game ended, then-Vice-president Al Gore hosted the awarding ceremony by handing Brazilian captain Dunga the prestigious trophy; the Brazil national team dedicated the title to the deceased Formula One motor racing champion and countryman Ayrton Senna, who had died two and a half months prior.

The tournament's Golden Boot went jointly to Bulgaria's Stoichkov and Oleg Salenko of Russia, the latter becoming the first player to score five goals in a game, coming in a 6–1 victory against Cameroon. Both players scored six goals in the tournament. Brazilian striker Romário, with five goals, won the Golden Ball as the tournament's best player.

Despite the controversy, the U.S. staged a hugely successful tournament, with an average attendance of nearly 70,000, surpassing the 1966 FIFA World Cup average attendance of 51,000, thanks to the large seating capacities of the stadiums in the United States in comparison to the generally smaller venues of Europe and Latin America. To this day, the total attendance for the final tournament of nearly 3.6 million remains the highest in World Cup history, despite the expansion of the competition from 24 to 32 teams at the 1998 World Cup in France.

Opening ceremony

The opening ceremony of the World Cup was held on June 17 at Chicago's Soldier Field. The ceremony was emceed by Oprah Winfrey, who fell off the dais in introducing Diana Ross, who gave a musical performance. Ross was also supposed to kick a soccer ball into the goal from the penalty spot at the beginning of her performance, with the goal then splitting in two as part of a pre-orchestrated stunt. She kicked the ball wide to the left, missing the goal, but the goalposts collapsed anyway in accordance with the stunt plans. In addition, Daryl Hall and Jon Secada also gave musical performances. It was officially opened by then-President Bill Clinton.

Group stage
Times are Eastern Daylight Time (UTC−4) (East Rutherford, Foxborough, Orlando, Pontiac and Washington), Central Daylight Time (UTC−5) (Chicago and Dallas), and Pacific Daylight Time (UTC−7) (Pasadena and Stanford).

In the following tables:
Pld = total games played
W = total games won
D = total games drawn (tied)
L = total games lost
GF = total goals scored (goals for)
GA = total goals conceded (goals against)
GD = goal difference (GF−GA)
Pts = total points accumulated

Group A

The Group A game between the United States and Switzerland was the first to take place indoors, played under the roof at the Pontiac Silverdome.

Following the tournament, Colombian defender Andrés Escobar was shot dead on his return to Colombia, after his own goal had contributed to his country's elimination.

Victories against Colombia and the United States (in front of a crowd of 93,869) were enough to see Romania through as group winners, despite a 4–1 hammering by Switzerland in between. The magnitude of that victory allowed Switzerland to move ahead of the United States on goal difference, although the hosts qualified for the second round as one of the best third-placed teams.

Switzerland's 4–1 victory over Romania came nearly 40 years to the date of Switzerland's last World Cup victory, also a 4–1 victory, on that occasion over Italy. The United States' 2–1 victory over Colombia was its first World Cup victory since June 29, 1950, when it upset England 1–0 in the 1950 World Cup.

Group B

Group B produced two of the four semi-finalists of this World Cup — Brazil and Sweden — and was also one of the two groups in which only two, rather than three, sides progressed to the second round. The match between the two eliminated teams, Cameroon and Russia, broke two World Cup records. Oleg Salenko of Russia became the first – and remains the only – man to score five goals in a single World Cup game as Russia won 6–1. The goals also ensured that Salenko finished the tournament joint-top scorer with six goals, having previously bagged one against Sweden. Cameroon left a mark too as Roger Milla, at the age of 42, became the oldest World Cup goalscorer of all time, as he grabbed his side's consolation goal in the game. The result was not enough to take Russia through following losses to Brazil and Sweden. Brazil beat Cameroon, and then confirmed the top spot with a draw to Sweden.

The Swedes also progressed, finishing in second place with five points. Sweden's 3–1 victory over Russia was the nation's first World Cup victory since July 3, 1974. Russia failed to progress to the second round for the second time, while Cameroon failed to repeat their surprise performance from the previous tournament.

Group C

As was the case with Group B, Group C would only send two teams into the Round of 16 as Spain and defending champions Germany progressed to round two. Coming from two goals down with four minutes left to snatch a 2–2 draw against Spain, the South Koreans very nearly eclipsed that feat against Germany when they came from 3–0 down to lose narrowly 3–2. In spite of these comebacks, South Korea was held to a 0–0 draw against Bolivia in their other group game when a win would have seen them through. Spain's late implosion against the South Koreans effectively decided that it would be Germany who won the group and not them.

Germany, who defeated Bolivia 1–0 in the tournament's opening game, finished with seven points. Spain had to settle for second place despite leading in all three games.

Despite Bolivia finishing last in the group, Erwin Sanchez made team history after scoring the nation's first World Cup goal in a 3–1 loss to Spain. Prior to 1994, Bolivia had never scored in either of their previous appearances at the 1930 and 1950 World Cups.

Group D

Tournament favorites Argentina led by Diego Maradona collected a maximum of six points from their opening two games after dominating Greece 4–0 in Foxboro with a Gabriel Batistuta hattrick before winning a close match against a formidable Nigeria with a 2–1 victory on the same field four days later; despite this Argentina finished third in the group. Nigeria had been very impressive on their World Cup debut, and despite the narrow loss to Argentina, had emerged as group winners following victories against Bulgaria and Greece, the latter in which Nigeria doubled its lead late on a goal from Daniel Amokachi – a goal that would allow Nigeria to top its group. Maradona only played with Argentina during their first two games, both in Foxborough (playing Greece and Nigeria and scoring his last ever World Cup goal against the former); he was thrown out of the tournament after testing positive for ephedrine.

Having qualified for the tournament through a last-gasp goal against France, Bulgaria surprised many people, as the nation had never even won a game at the World Cup finals prior to this tournament. Despite losing its opening game 3–0 to Nigeria, Bulgaria came back in style with a 4–0 win over Greece (who had suffered exactly the same fate five days earlier against Argentina), and a 2–0 win against Argentina saw them advance. Argentina had actually been winning the group going into injury time, while Bulgaria played the last 25 minutes with 10 men; however, a 91st-minute header from Nasko Sirakov meant that Argentina dropped two places and finished third. Nigeria won the group on goal difference. Bulgaria's victory over Argentina earned them second place.

Group E

Group E remains the only group in World Cup history in which all four teams finished with the same points and same goal difference. It began at Giants Stadium where Ray Houghton's chip ensured a shock Irish victory over the then-three-time champions Italy by 1–0, as well as gaining a measure of revenge for the previous World Cup, in which Italy both hosted and eliminated Ireland at the quarter-final stage. The next day in Washington, Norway played its first World Cup game since 1938 and Kjetil Rekdal's goal five minutes from time proved decisive in an equally tense encounter as Norway beat Mexico.

In the second round of group play, Luis García's double had Mexico 2–0 up and in control of the game before a disagreement on the touchline resulted in fines for both Republic of Ireland's manager, Jack Charlton, and their striker John Aldridge. Aldridge was able to regain concentration in time to score six minutes from the end of the game to make it 2–1. Despite their loss, Aldridge's goal proved crucial to Ireland in the final group standings.

During the previous day at Giants Stadium in New Jersey, Italy's World Cup hopes seemed to be diminishing fast as goalkeeper Gianluca Pagliuca was sent off with the game still at 0–0. Yet despite this, Italy was still able to salvage an important 1–0 victory. Norway would ultimately pay a price for their inability to take advantage of Pagliuca's dismissal. With the four teams level on points, the final two group games would each have to finish as draws for things to stay that way. Republic of Ireland made it through after a dreary 0–0 draw with Norway; midfielders Massaro and Bernal traded strikes as Italy and Mexico played to a 1–1 draw.

Those results meant that Mexico won the group on goals scored, with three in the group. With Ireland and Italy also progressing having finished with identical records, the Irish team qualified as second place as a result of their victory against the Italians. Norway's shortcomings in attack ultimately let them down, and they exited the tournament with only one goal.

Group F

Just as happened to Argentina in Group D, Belgium endured the same fate in Group F. Despite winning both of its first two matches 1–0 against Morocco and neighbors Netherlands, Belgium finished third as, in an upset, it lost to tournament newcomers Saudi Arabia 1–0 in the third game. During that game, Saudi player Saaed Al-Owairian ran from his own half through a maze of Belgian players to score the game's only goal.

Saudi Arabia advanced through to the Round of 16 as well, having also defeated Morocco 2–1. The Netherlands endured a somewhat nervier experience. The opening 2–1 victory against Saudi Arabia was followed by the 1–0 loss against Belgium before another 2–1 victory against Morocco, with Bryan Roy scoring the winner a mere 12 minutes from time, saw the Dutch win the group having scored more goals than Belgium and beaten Saudi Arabia. Morocco, despite losing all three of their group games, did not leave without a fight, as each of their losses were by just a single goal, 1–0 to Belgium, 2–1 to Saudi Arabia, and 2–1 to the Netherlands.

Ranking of third-placed teams

Knockout stage

Round of 16

Quarter-finals

Semi-finals

Third place play-off

Final

Statistics

Goalscorers

Hristo Stoichkov and Oleg Salenko received the Golden Boot for scoring six goals. In total, 141 goals were scored by 81 players, with only one of them credited as an own goal.

6 goals
  Hristo Stoichkov
  Oleg Salenko
5 goals
  Romário
  Roberto Baggio
  Jürgen Klinsmann
  Kennet Andersson
4 goals
  Gabriel Batistuta
  Florin Răducioiu
  Martin Dahlin
3 goals

  Bebeto
  Dennis Bergkamp
  Gheorghe Hagi
  José Luis Caminero
  Tomas Brolin

2 goals

  Claudio Caniggia
  Philippe Albert
  Yordan Letchkov
  Adolfo Valencia
  Rudi Völler
  Dino Baggio
  Hong Myung-bo
  Luis García
  Wim Jonk
  Daniel Amokachi
  Emmanuel Amunike
  Ilie Dumitrescu
  Fuad Anwar
  Ion Andoni Goikoetxea
  Adrian Knup

1 goal

  Abel Balbo
  Diego Maradona
  Marc Degryse
  Georges Grün
  Erwin Sánchez
  Branco
  Márcio Santos
  Raí
  Daniel Borimirov
  Nasko Sirakov
  David Embé
  Roger Milla
  François Omam-Biyik
  Hernán Gaviria
  John Harold Lozano
  Lothar Matthäus
  Karl-Heinz Riedle
  John Aldridge
  Ray Houghton
  Daniele Massaro
  Hwang Sun-hong
  Seo Jung-won
  Mohammed Chaouch
  Hassan Nader
  Marcelino Bernal
  Alberto García Aspe
  Bryan Roy
  Gaston Taument
  Aron Winter
  Finidi George
  Samson Siasia
  Rashidi Yekini
  Kjetil Rekdal
  Dan Petrescu
  Dmitri Radchenko
  Fahad Al-Ghesheyan
  Sami Al-Jaber
  Saeed Al-Owairan
  Txiki Begiristain
  Pep Guardiola
  Fernando Hierro
  Luis Enrique
  Julio Salinas
  Henrik Larsson
  Roger Ljung
  Håkan Mild
  Georges Bregy
  Stéphane Chapuisat
  Alain Sutter
  Earnie Stewart
  Eric Wynalda

Own goals
  Andrés Escobar (against the United States)

Awards

All-star team
The All-star team is a squad consisting of the eleven most impressive players at the 1994 World Cup, as selected by FIFA's Technical Study Group.

Final standings
After the tournament, FIFA published a ranking of all teams that competed in the 1994 World Cup finals based on progress in the competition, overall results and quality of the opposition.

Disciplinary statistics
Total number of yellow cards: 235
Average yellow cards per game: 4.52
Total number of red cards: 15
Average red cards per match: 0.29
First yellow card of the tournament: Jürgen Kohler – Germany against Bolivia
First red card of the tournament: Marco Etcheverry – Bolivia against Germany
Fastest yellow card from kick off: 1 minute – Sergei Gorlukovich – Russia against Sweden
Fastest yellow card after coming on as substitute: 2 minutes – Daniel Borimirov – Bulgaria against Greece (introduced in the 82nd minute)
Latest yellow card in a game without extra time: 90 minutes – José Luis Caminero – Spain against Bolivia, Yuri Nikiforov – Russia against Cameroon, Mohamed Al-Deayea – Saudi Arabia against Morocco
Latest yellow card in a game with extra time: 108 minutes – Basarab Panduru – Romania against Sweden
Fastest dismissal from kick off: 21 minutes – Gianluca Pagliuca – Italy against Norway
Fastest dismissal of a substitute: 3 minutes – Ion Vlădoiu – Romania against Switzerland (introduced in the 80th minute)
Latest dismissal in a game without extra time: 89 minutes – Gustavo Quinteros – Bolivia against Germany
Latest dismissal in a game with extra time: 101 minutes – Stefan Schwarz – Sweden against Romania
Least time difference between two yellow cards given to the same player: 21 minutes – Fernando Clavijo – United States against Brazil (booked in the 64th minute and again in the 85th minute)
Most yellow cards (team): 23 – Bulgaria
Most red cards (team): 2 – Bolivia, Bulgaria, Italy, Sweden
Fewest yellow cards (team): 5 – Cameroon
Most yellow cards (player): 4 – Zlatko Yankov
Most red cards (player): 1 – Fernando Clavijo, Luis Cristaldo, Marco Etcheverry, Luis García, Sergei Gorlukovich, Emil Kremenliev, Leonardo, Miguel Ángel Nadal, Gianluca Pagliuca, Stefan Schwarz, Rigobert Song, Jonas Thern, Tsanko Tsvetanov, Ion Vlădoiu, Gianfranco Zola
Most yellow cards (match): 10 – Mexico vs Bulgaria
Most red cards (match): 2 – Mexico vs Bulgaria
Fewest yellow cards (match): 1 – Netherlands vs Republic of Ireland
Most cards in one match: 10 yellow cards and 2 red cards – Mexico vs Bulgaria

Symbols

Mascot

The official mascot of this World Cup was "Striker, the World Cup Pup", a dog wearing a red, white and blue soccer uniform with a ball. Striker was designed by the Warner Bros. animation team. A dog was picked as the mascot because dogs are a common pet in the United States.

Match ball

The official match ball was "Questra", manufactured by Adidas.

Music

The official song was "Gloryland".

Aftermath and legacy

 Although USA '94 marked the seventh time FIFA hosted the World Cup in the Americas (after being held in Uruguay, Brazil, Chile, Argentina, and twice by Mexico in 1970 and 1986), the United States became the first host in the American continent outside of the Latin American spectrum, and the first in the Anglosphere outside of England.
 The game between the United States and Switzerland at the Pontiac Silverdome on June 18 was the first to be played indoors in World Cup history: grass was grown by Michigan State University and was the first time since 1965 (the failed attempt at the Astrodome) that natural turf was used in an indoor stadium in the United States. To date, only Sapporo Dome in 2002 and Arena AufSchalke in 2006 have subsequently hosted indoor games in World Cup history.
 Oleg Salenko of Russia became the first player to score five goals in a single World Cup finals game in his country's group stage win over Cameroon. Cameroon's Roger Milla also scored a goal in the same game, becoming the oldest player to score a goal in a World Cup. At 42, he was also the oldest player to appear in a World Cup, a record held until 2014, when Faryd Mondragón (43 years, 3 days) of Colombia broke the record in their game against Japan at the 2014 FIFA World Cup. In turn, goalkeeper Essam El Hadary (45 years, 161 days) of Egypt would surpass Mondragón against Saudi Arabia, in the Volgograd Arena, Volgograd, Russia, on June 25, 2018. However, Milla remains to be the oldest outfield player to perform in the World Cup.
 For the first time, during the entering of the players onto the field, the FIFA Anthem, composed by Franz Lambert, was played.
 Gianluca Pagliuca of Italy became the first goalkeeper to be sent off in a World Cup game, dismissed for handling outside his area against Norway.
 Brazil's 11 goals in their seven games was a record for the lowest average goals scored per game for any World Cup-winning side, but this record was broken by Spain's eight goals in 2010. The three goals Brazil conceded in those seven games was at the time also the lowest average goals conceded per game, although this was subsequently surpassed by France in 1998, Italy in 2006, and Spain in 2010.
 The finals were the first time FIFA decided to experiment with the style of jerseys worn by officials, foregoing the traditional black. They could choose between burgundy, yellow or silver shirts depending on what was necessary to avoid a clash of colors with the two competing teams. This custom has since been followed, but with black shirts added as an option later.
 The finals were also the first time that players had their shirt numbers printed on the center front (or on the right or left breast, in Morocco's and Russia's case respectively) of the shirt, as well as their names printed on the back of their jerseys in a World Cup, just as other American sports did, to make their identification easier for sportscasters. This custom followed from Euro 92, and has followed ever since (although numbers printed on the center front had been experimented during the 1991 FIFA U-20 World Cup held in Portugal).
 The finals were the first to award 3 points for a win in the group stage to motivate teams to play an attacking style.
 In disciplinary matters, for the first time yellow cards accumulated in the group stage were wiped clean after its completion, and players started with a clean slate at the start of the knockout stage. Previously, players were suspended for one game if accumulating two yellow cards throughout the tournament. Now, players were suspended for one game after accumulating two yellow cards in the group stage, or two yellow cards in the knockout stage. This was in response to the situation in 1990, where players such as Claudio Caniggia and Paul Gascoigne were suspended for the later games.
 The 1994 World Cup revolutionized television coverage of sports in the United States through the sponsored scoreboard and game clock that were constantly shown on screen throughout the game. Television sports coverage in the United States had long been dependent upon commercial breaks, a feature suitable for sports such as baseball, basketball, ice hockey and American football (which all have breaks in the action), but long considered incompatible with soccer, due to the long stretches of uninterrupted play. Variations on it were quickly incorporated into virtually every team sports broadcast by the decade's end. The first American pro sports broadcaster to do this was Fox Sports, which won national rights to broadcast the NFL's National Football Conference from CBS six months before the 1994 World Cup began.
 The 1994 World Cup final was the first (and to date only) goalless final in World Cup history. It was also the first to be decided by a penalty shootout, with the 2006 and 2022 finals ending in similar circumstances.
 This was the last World Cup in which games other than the last two in each group were played simultaneously, although this only happened once in this tournament: Saudi Arabia v Morocco and Belgium v Netherlands in Group F. From France '98 onwards, each game in the first two rounds of group play and the whole knockout stage have been played separately to maximize television audiences.
 This was the last World Cup featuring 24 nations, and the last in which third-placed teams were still able to progress to the round of 16. From 1998 on, there were 32 nations, with only the top two in each group progressing.
 This was the first and the last World Cup in which both teams taking part in the third-place game, Sweden and Bulgaria, received bronze medals.

See also

 Soccer in the United States
 1999 FIFA Women's World Cup – a first Women's World Cup hosted by the United States
 2003 FIFA Women's World Cup – a second Women's World Cup hosted by the United States
 Copa América Centenario – First edition of the Copa América hosted within the United States
 2026 FIFA World Cup – an upcoming tournament to be co-hosted by the United States, Mexico and Canada.

References

External links

1994 FIFA World Cup USA, FIFA.com
1994 World Cup details RSSSF
FIFA Technical Report (Part 1), (Part 2), (Part 3) and (Part 4)
The event at SVT's open archive 

 
World Cup
FIFA World Cup tournaments
International association football competitions hosted by the United States
World
Sports in Stanford, California
1994 in the United States
June 1994 sports events in the United States
July 1994 sports events in the United States
1994 in American sports